Ambria was a cargo ship that was built in 1922 by Deutsche Werft, Finkenwerder for German owners. She was sold in 1934 and renamed Gumbinnen. She was sunk by a British destroyer in 1941, raised and repaired. Gumbinnen was seized by the Allies in Flensburg, in May 1945, passed to the Ministry of War Transport (MoWT) and renamed Empire Conleith. In 1946, she was allocated to the Norwegian Government and renamed Dragnes. She was sold into Norwegian merchant service and renamed Mimona. In 1959, she was sold and renamed Malay. She served until 1961 when she was scrapped.

Description
The ship was built in 1922 as yard number 20 by Deutsche Werft, Finkenwerder.

The ship had a GRT of 1,380 and a NRT of 800. She had a deadweight tonnage of 2,081.

As built, the ship was propelled by two steam turbines, double reduction geared, driving a single screw propeller. The turbines were built by Allgemeine Elektrizitäts-Gesellschaft, Berlin.

History
Ambria was built for Hamburg-Amerika Packetfarht AG, Hamburg. The Code Letters RCVQ were allocated. She was launched on 26 August 1922. She was beached at Penzance, Cornwall. In 1928, she was sold to Deutsche Levant Linie AG, Bremen. In 1934 Her Code Letters were changed to DHBA. Also in 1934, Ambria was sold to  Kohlen-Import & Poseidon Schiffahrt AG, Köningsberg and was renamed Gumbinnen. In 1934, Gumbinnen was re-engined. The engine was built by F Schichau GmbH, Elbing.

In 1940, her port of registry was changed to Nordenham. She was raised and repaired at Göteborg, Sweden. In May 1945, Gumbinnen was seized by the Allies at Flensburg. Ownership passed to the MoWT and she was placed under the management of A F Henry & MacGregor Ltd. Her port of registry was changed to London. The Code letters GSMY and United Kingdom Official Number 180713 were allocated.

In 1946, Empire Conleith was allocated to the Norwegian Government and was renamed Dragnes. She was sold to K Andersen & Co in 1947 and renamed Mimona. In 1959, she was sold to T Halvorsen AS and renamed Malay. She served until 1961 when she was scrapped in Grimstad.

References

External links
Photo of Gumbinnen

1922 ships
Ships built in Hamburg
Steamships of Germany
Merchant ships of Germany
Maritime incidents in 1926
World War II merchant ships of Germany
Maritime incidents in March 1941
Ministry of War Transport ships
Empire ships
Steamships of the United Kingdom
Merchant ships of the United Kingdom
Steamships of Norway